Davy Jones is a fictional character in the Pirates of the Caribbean film series, portrayed by Bill Nighy. 

He is first mentioned in The Curse of the Black Pearl, appears as one of the main antagonists in Dead Man's Chest and At World's End, and makes a cameo appearance in Dead Men Tell No Tales. Once a mortal pirate, Davy Jones is the tyrannical captain of the Flying Dutchman (based on the ghost ship of the same name), the dark lord of the Seven Seas and also Jack Sparrow's and Will Turner's archenemy.

The computer-generated imagery used to complete Jones was named by Entertainment Weekly as the tenth favorite computer-generated film character in film history, behind King Kong in 2007. The work on Davy Jones by Industrial Light and Magic earned them the 2006 Academy Award for Visual Effects for Dead Man's Chest.

The character is based on the superstition of Davy Jones' Locker.

Conception and creation

Before officially casting Bill Nighy, producers also met Jim Broadbent, Iain Glen and Richard E. Grant for the role.

Like the entire crew of the Flying Dutchman (except "Bootstrap Bill"), Davy Jones' physical appearance is completely computer-generated. Nighy's performance was recorded using motion capture during filming on the set, with Nighy wearing several markers in both a grey suit and his face, rather than in a studio during post-production. Nighy wore make-up around his eyes, since the original plan was to use his real eyes in the digital character if necessary to get the proper lighting. In addition, he also wore make-up on his lips and around his mouth, to assist in the motion capture of his character's Scottish accent. Davy Jones briefly appears as a human for a single scene in the third film, played by Nighy in costume. Several reviewers have in fact mistakenly identified Nighy as wearing prosthetic makeup or a latex mask due to the computer-generated character's photorealism.

Design and appearance
The physique of Davy Jones and the other crew of the Flying Dutchman was designed by the films' producers to be a mixture of various aquatic flora and fauna features. In the third film, Tia Dalma reveals it is the fate of the captain and crew of the Dutchman should they fail or abandon their duties on board.

Jones' most striking feature is his cephalopod-like head: prehensile octopus-like appendages give the illusion of a thick beard, a prominent sac bulges from under his barnacle-encrusted tricorne, and he breathes through a siphon located on the left side of his face in the place of nasal features. Jones has a crustacean-style claw for his left arm, a long tentacle in place of the index finger on his right hand, and the right leg of a crab (resembling a pegleg). It is revealed in the bonus features of the Special Edition DVD that Jones' skin color was partly inspired by a coffee-stained styrofoam cup which was then scanned into ILM's computers to be used as such.

Jones speaks with a clearly distinguishable, albeit thick, Scottish accent that is slightly altered to account for his lack of a nose, and presumably, a nasal cavity and/or sinuses. Originally, director Gore Verbinski wanted Jones to be Dutch, as he is the captain of the "Dutch-man". Nighy however responded, "I don't do Dutch. So I decided on Scottish." Nighy later revealed that the Scottish sitcom Still Game influenced his choice of accent, stating: "I had to find an accent no one else had. Although Alex Norton is Scottish, mine was slightly different. We wanted something that was distinctive and authoritative...I have seen Still Game and I am a fan. The sort of extremity of the accent was inspired in that area."

Character biography

Before the films

Davy Jones, a mortal Scottish pirate and a great sailor, fell in love with Calypso, a sea goddess. She entrusted him with the task of ferrying the souls of those who died at sea to the next world. Calypso gave him the Flying Dutchman to accomplish this task. She swore that after ten years, she would meet him and they would spend one day together before he returned to his duties. However, when Jones returned to shore after ten years, Calypso failed to appear. Believing Calypso had betrayed him, a heartbroken and enraged Davy Jones turned the Pirate Brethren against her, saying that if she were removed from the world, they would be able to claim the seas for themselves. They assembled in the First Brethren Court and Jones successfully taught them how to imprison her into her human form.

Despite betraying her, Jones still loved Calypso, and in despair and guilt for what he had done, he carved out his own heart from his body and placed it in the "Dead Man's Chest". The Chest was sealed and placed within a larger wooden chest, along with Jones' numerous love letters to Calypso and all other items having to do with her, except his matching musical locket. The chest was then buried on Isla Cruces. Jones kept the chest's key with him at all times, leaving the locket beside the massive pipe organ aboard the Dutchman. With Calypso gone, Jones abandoned his duties and returned to the Seven Seas. As a result of this, Jones gradually became monstrous, his physical appearance merging with various aquatic fauna. Sailors everywhere would fear him to the death, for Davy Jones had turned fierce and cruel, with an insatiable taste for all things brutal. Jones recruits dying sailors by promising them a reprieve from death in exchange for 100 years of service aboard the Dutchman. During this time, he comes to command the Kraken, a feared mythological sea monster.

In the book series about Jack Sparrow's earlier adventures, Davy Jones shows interest in the Sword of Cortes, also sought by Jack. He is a minor character, but appears in the seventh book as Jack and his crew encounter the Flying Dutchman.

Jones also appears in the prequel book about Jack's first years as a captain. He helps the Brethren Court to identify the traitor among them, who turns out to be Borya Palachnik, the Pirate Lord of the Caspian Sea.

Before the events of the first film, Davy Jones approaches Sparrow with a deal: Jones will raise the Black Pearl back from Davy Jones' Locker, allowing Sparrow to be captain for 13 years if Sparrow agrees to serve on the Dutchman for 100 years. This event, referenced in the films, also appears in the book series.

Dead Man's Chest

Davy Jones first appears in the second film, Dead Man's Chest, in which he attempts to collect on his bargain with Jack Sparrow, sending Bootstrap Bill to threaten Jack and give him the black spot to attract the Kraken. Previously, Davy Jones had raised the Black Pearl from the sea for Sparrow, in exchange for Sparrow's soul after captaining the Pearl for 13 years. Attempting to get out of the situation, Sparrow argues that he was the captain for only two years before Hector Barbossa committed mutiny. Jones rejects this explanation, explaining that despite the mutiny, Jack still stubbornly gave himself the title "Captain". Sparrow then attempts to escape the deal by providing Will Turner as a substitute for himself. Jack falsely strikes a new deal with Jones; Jack will be spared enslavement on the Dutchman if he brings Jones one hundred souls to replace his own within the next three days (in reality he plans to recruit a new crew to help him find the Dead Man's Chest to save Will and break his debt). Jones accepts, removes the black spot from Jack's hand, and retains Will, keeping him as a "good faith payment."

While on the Dutchman, Will challenges Jones at a game of liar's dice. They wager Will's soul for an eternity of service against the key to the Dead Man's Chest. Bootstrap Bill joins the game and purposefully loses to save Will. During the game, Will learns where Jones keeps the key, being his real purpose in the game. The next morning, Jones realizes the key is gone and summons the Kraken to destroy the ship carrying Turner, who actually survives. The Dutchman then sails to Isla Cruces to stop Sparrow from getting the Chest.

Arriving, Jones sends his crew to retrieve the Chest; they return to him with it. The Dutchman then chases after the Black Pearl, but is outrun. Jones summons the Kraken, which drags Jack Sparrow and the Pearl to Davy Jones's Locker. He afterward opens the Chest only to find his heart missing; it having been taken by James Norrington, who gives it to Lord Cutler Beckett, the chairman of the East India Trading Company.

At World's End

In the third film At World's End, Jones is under the control of Beckett, under the threat of death. Beckett orders Jones to sink pirate ships, but is infuriated when Jones leaves no survivors; Beckett wants prisoners to interrogate about the Brethren Court. Beckett also orders Jones to kill the Kraken. Later, he orders Jones attack the Pirate Lord Sao Feng; Jones subsequently kills Sao and captures Elizabeth Swann, who had been named captain by Sao Feng upon his death. When Admiral James Norrington dies on board the Dutchman while helping Elizabeth escape, Jones claims Norrington's sword (originally crafted by Will Turner). Jones then attempts mutiny against the EITC. However, Mercer successfully defends the Chest, forcing Jones to continue under Beckett's service.

Beckett later summons Jones to his ship, the Endeavour. Jones confronts Will Turner and divulges his past with Calypso while learning of Jack Sparrow's escape from the Locker. The three men then arrive at Shipwreck Cove.

Jones confronts Calypso, locked in the brig of the Black Pearl. The two former lovers discuss Calypso's betrayal and Jones's curse. Calypso temporarily lifts his curse, allowing him to be seen briefly in his original human form. Jones tells her that his heart will always belong to her. Calypso, unaware that Jones betrayed her to the first Brethren Court, says that after her release, she will fully give her love to him.

Jones participates in a parley in which the EITC trades Turner for Sparrow with the latter actually planning to stab the heart. After Calypso is freed, Will reveals that Jones betrayed her. She escapes, refusing to aid either the pirates or Jones. Her fury creates a monstrous maelstrom. The Dutchman and the Pearl enter it and battle.

During the battle, Jones suffocates Mercer to death with his tentacles and retrieves the key to the Chest. Sparrow and Jones fight for control of the chest in the rigging of the Dutchman. Jack acquires both the Chest and the key while Jones battles Will and Elizabeth. Jones quickly overpowers Elizabeth, and is subsequently impaled through the back by Will. Jones, unharmed, holds Will at sword-point. Jack threatens to stab the heart, and Jones cruelly stabs Will. Remembering Will as his son, Bootstrap Bill briefly fights and overpowers Jones, but is quickly defeated. Jones attempts to kill Bootstrap, but Jack helps Will stab the heart. Jones then calls out for Calypso, before tumbling to his death in the maelstrom.

Dead Men Tell No Tales

In the post-credits scene of the fifth film Dead Men Tell No Tales, Will (no longer bound to the Flying Dutchman after the destruction of the Trident of Poseidon) and Elizabeth are sleeping in their bed together when their room is entered by the silhouette of an apparently resurrected Davy Jones. Just as Will sees Jones raising his clawed arm to strike at the couple, Will awakens and sees that the room is empty. Assuming Jones' appearance to be a nightmare, Will goes back to sleep, oblivious to the presence of barnacles on the floor amid a small puddle of seawater that reveals that Jones is possibly back and it may not be a nightmare.

Characterization

Music
Jones and Calypso possess a matching set of heart-shaped music-box lockets that play a distinct melody (the latter is a half-step above the former's), and Jones is known to play this melody on his pipe organ. The melody is also Jones' theme as heard throughout the films featuring him; it comes in two variations: one heard only in the Dead Man's Chest soundtrack, and a simpler variant played in the films on several occasions (including briefly after his appearance in Dead Men Tell No Tales).

Personality
Davy Jones is identified as the Devil by his crew: he is cruel, cunning, ruthless, greedy, murderous and careless of other people; these traits make him similar to Cutler Beckett. Evil, proud and possibly nihilistic, he also tried to force Jack Sparrow to leave Will with him and bring him 100 souls knowing that Sparrow is against slavery. Excluding those who manage to reach an agreement with him, Davy Jones presents himself as an extremely formidable enemy, without hesitation or reservation. Unlike the cowardly Beckett, Jones is brave and daring, and he can be very scary and quick-tempered to prove he is serious. It becomes more dangerous when he realizes that he has been cheated: in fact when Jack Sparrow revealed that he had not recruited 100 souls to give to him in exchange for his (not being able to force himself to do a horrible thing), but that he had instead gone to get his heart to blackmail him into leaving him and his crew alone. Jones began shooting at the Black Pearl, trying to sink it again to give Sparrow pain, knowing how much he cares about the ship. Although he does not tolerate the violation of his contracts, he never respects his promises. Probably due to the betrayal of his beloved Calypso, Jones is extremely convinced of the cruelty and unhappiness of life; in fact, his phrase is explanatory of this vision: "Life is cruel! Why should the afterlife be any different?". His passionate nature is rarely shown to others, such as when he plays her theme on the pipe organ as he sheds a tear on Calypso and eventually meets her aboard the Black Pearl. In times of intense emotional distress, Jones uses his organ to vent his anger and suffering. Despite the wickedness, anger and bitterness that characterize him, Davy Jones has a repressed feeling of love and goodness: even after being betrayed by Calypso, Jones still loves her, and her name is in fact the last word that pronounce before dying.

Davy Jones speaks with a strong Scottish accent, accentuated by various vocal and facial tics, which make it even more disturbing. His typical laugh is greasy and mocking.

Powers and abilities

Davy Jones possesses a large number of supernatural abilities. Jones is capable of teleportation on board ships at sea, and he can pass through solid objects. His crew are bound to his every whim, and his enchanted ship, the Flying Dutchman, is capable of traveling underwater.

Jones is immortal, capable of surviving injuries that would be fatal to mortals, though not impervious to pain. In particular, he was able to cut out his heart and leave it disembodied; this soon becomes his only real weakness, as the heart can be possessed by others and used to kill him or leverage him under their control.

Jones can also track any soul that is owed to him using the black spot. Any member of his crew can mark a victim with the black spot, but only Jones himself can remove it. Jones also has the power to control and call forth the Kraken, a sea monster that can destroy ships upon command.

Jones is unable to step on dry land except once every ten years. However, he can stand and even walk given his path has buckets of seawater for him to place his feet in (as seen during the parley on a sandbar in At World's End), and he can also send his crew ashore in his stead.

In a physical confrontation, Jones' mutated physiology also gives him various advantages. His facial tentacles allow him to manipulate objects with the dexterity of a cephalopod and with greater versatility, as seen when he masterfully plays his pipe organ. As he uses his tentacles, his non-human hands can be thus left free to accomplish other tasks, such as when he is able to restrain Mercer's arms while creatively smothering him with his tentacles. His tentacle finger allows him to exert a much stronger grip and control his sword more quickly and precisely than a normal hand could, and his crab claw hand possesses enough strength to halt melee attacks and bend or sever sword blades. He also demonstrates more general superhuman strength when he throws Jack off the crossbeam using only his right arm.

Merchandise
Davy Jones was a part of Series One of the Pirates of the Caribbean: Dead Man's Chest action figure set produced by NECA. Although the initial run of figures had a sticker on the box that proclaimed that the figure came with the Dead Man's Chest and Jones' heart, both props (as well as the key) were released with the Bootstrap Bill figure in Series Two. 

Many different sized figurines of Jones were also produced by the toy company Zizzle in 2006 and 2007 including an appearance as a smaller figure with crew members Angler, Wheelback and Penrod as well as in a 3 figure pack with Hector Barbossa and a limited edition gold Jack Sparrow for At World's End.

Jones was issued as a plush toy as part of Sega's "Dead Man's Chest" plush assortment. 

Davy Jones and his ship, the Flying Dutchman, were produced as a Mega Blocks set for the movies Dead Man's Chest and Pirates of the Caribbean: At World's End. Although his Minifigure counterpart in the Dead Man's Chest set has more bluish tentacles then his counterpart in the At World's End set, which has more greenish tentacles.

A Lego minifigure of Jones was released in November 2011 in the Lego Pirates of the Caribbean theme. 

Children's and adult Halloween costumes were released for Halloween 2007.

Davy Jones was released as a PEZ dispenser, along with Jack Sparrow and Will Turner.

Hot Toys also announced plans to make a 1:6 version of Davy Jones, which became available in 2008. It is widely regarded as more detailed than those produced by NECA.

Other appearances
Davy Jones is also featured as a playable character in Disney Infinity alongside Jack Sparrow and Hector Barbossa. As with the other playable characters in the game, a tie-in figure for Davy Jones was also released.
Davy Jones is a playable character in the video game Disney Magic Kingdoms.
Davy Jones makes his debut appearance in the Kingdom Hearts series in Kingdom Hearts III, reprising his role from At World's End. He is voiced by Robin Atkin Downes in the English version and by Hōchū Ōtsuka in the Japanese version. Due to censorship rules, Jones' duels with Jack Sparrow and Will Turner are significantly toned down, and his heart is not physically seen in the game.
Davy Jones also makes an appearance in the video game Sea of Thieves with the update "A Pirate's Life".

References

External links
Davy Jones on IMDb

Pirates of the Caribbean characters
Disney animated characters
Fictional personifications of death
Adventure film characters
Fictional characters who can teleport
Fictional characters who can turn intangible
Fictional characters with superhuman strength
Fictional human hybrids
Fictional sea captains
Fictional sea pirates
Fictional swordfighters in films
Fictional Scottish people
Film characters introduced in 2006
Male characters in film
Action film villains
Fictional mass murderers
Male film villains
Psychopomps